Fritz Ohlwärter (born 25 February 1948) is a West German bobsledder who competed during the mid to late 1970s. He won five medals at the FIBT World Championships with four silvers (Two-man: 1974, 1975, 1979; Four-man: 1975) and one bronze (Four-man: 1977).

Ohlwärter also finished fifth in the four-man event at the 1976 Winter Olympics in Innsbruck.

References

External links
Bobsleigh two-man world championship medalists since 1931
Bobsleigh four-man world championship medalists since 1930
Wallechinsky, David (1984). "Bobsled: Four-man". In The Complete Book of the Olympics: 1896 - 1980. New York: Penguin Books. p. 561.

Living people
1948 births
Bobsledders at the 1976 Winter Olympics
Olympic bobsledders of West Germany
German male bobsledders